The MacArthur Bowl is a trophy awarded annually by the National Football Foundation (NFF) (owners and operators of the College Football Hall of Fame) to the NCAA Division I Football Bowl Subdivision college football team(s) that are recognized by the NFF as the National Champions for that season.

Much like the NHL's Stanley Cup, the trophy is kept by the winning institution for one year, then passed on to the next year's winner.

History
The trophy was the gift of an anonymous donor in honor of General Douglas MacArthur, a founder of National Football Foundation. The trophy features his famous quote: "There is no substitute for victory." MacArthur was known to have a keen interest in college football, Army Cadet football in particular. MacArthur had served as student manager of the Army team during his cadet days. During World War II, he sent a telegram congratulating Army on an undefeated 1944 College football season and defeat of Navy in the Army–Navy Game. The telegram read, "The greatest of all Army teams. We have stopped the war to celebrate your magnificent success."

The trophy was first presented in 1959, and has been presented annually since then. Since its inception, there have been occasions where the MacArthur trophy winner differed from the AP Poll winner, Coaches' Poll winner or both.  From 1998 to 2013 during the Bowl Championship Series (BCS) era, the trophy was awarded to the winner of the BCS National Championship Game.

With the advent of the College Football Playoff (CFP), the winner of the CFP National Championship automatically wins the MacArthur Bowl; the trophy is presented to the winning head coach in a ceremony held at the College Football Hall of Fame in the spring following the championship game.

Winners

By school

See also
AFCA National Championship Trophy
AP National Championship Trophy
Grantland Rice Trophy
BCS National Championship Game
College Football Playoff National Championship Trophy
NCAA Division I-A national football championship

References

External links
National Football Foundation official website

College football championship trophies